Novoselitskoye is a rural locality (a selo) and the administrative center of Novoselitsky District, Stavropol Krai, Russia. Population:

References

Notes

Sources

Rural localities in Stavropol Krai